The season 1995–96 of Segunda División B of Spanish football started August 1995 and ended May 1996.

Summary before the 1995–96 season 
Playoffs de Ascenso:

 Racing de Ferrol 
 Mensajero 
 Las Palmas 
 Pontevedra
 Alavés (P)
 Numancia
 Sestao (P)
 Beasain
 Levante 
 Gramanet
 Valencia B
 Castellón
 Córdoba 
 Almería (P) 
 Écija (P)
 Jaén

Relegated from Segunda División:

 Orense
 Palamós (relegated to Tercera División)

Promoted from Tercera División:

 Deportivo La Coruña B (from Group 1)
 As Pontes (from Group 1)
 Durango (from Group 4)
 Aurrerá (from Group 4)
 Barcelona C (from Group 5)
 Espanyol B (from Group 5)
 Novelda (from Group 6)
 Santa Ana (from Group 7)
 Cultural Leonesa (from Group 8)
 San Pedro (from Group 9)
 Málaga (from Group 9)
 Vélez (from Group 9)
 Utrera (from Group 10)
 Mallorca B (from Group 11)
 Salud Tenerife (from Group 9) (renamed as CD Tenerife B from 1995 to 1996 season)
 Huesca (from Group 16)
 Andorra (from Group 16)

Relegated:

 Real Oviedo B
 Real Ávila
 Corralejo
 Realejos
 Gimnástica de Torrelavega
 Zaragoza B
 Gernika
 Hullera Vasco-Leonesa
 Murcia
 Girona
 Europa
 Premià
 San Fernando
 San Roque de Lepe
 Cacereño
 Manchego
 Casetas

Administrative relegation:
 Palamós (financial trouble)
 FC Cartagena (financial trouble)

Occupied the vacant spots by administrative relegations:
 Gavà (occupied the vacant spot of Palamós)
 Lorca (occupied the vacant spot of FC Cartagena)

Occupied the vacant spots by Segunda División free spots due to Primera División expansion:
 Leganés B (occupied the vacant spot of Leganés)
 Gáldar (occupied the vacant spot of Getafe)

Group I
Teams from Canary Islands, Castilla–La Mancha, Community of Madrid and Galicia.

Teams

League table

Results

Top goalscorers

Top goalkeepers

Group II
Teams from Asturias, Basque Country, Castile and León, La Rioja and Navarre.

Teams

League Table

Results

Top goalscorers

Top goalkeepers

Group III
Teams from Andorra, Aragon, Balearic Islands, Catalonia and Valencian Community.

Teams

League Table

Results

Top goalscorers

Top goalkeepers

Group IV
Teams from Andalucia, Melilla, Region of Murcia, Valencian Community.

Teams

League Table

Results

Top goalscorers

Top goalkeepers

Play-offs

Group A

Group B

Group C

Group D

Play-out

Semifinal

Final

External links
Futbolme.com

 
Segunda División B seasons
3

Spain